This is the discography of the artist and producer Chris Seefried.

Since first becoming active in 1989, Seefried has released six studio albums and one soundtrack as an artist. He has two with Gods Child, two with Joe 90, one with Low Stars and one as a solo artist. There are many more as a producer and collaborator.

Discography – artist

Selected discography

Singles

Grammy Awards

|-
| rowspan="2"| 2016

|-
| Cheers to the Fall
| Best R&B Album
| 
|-
|}

Videography
 "Everybody's 1" (1994)
 "Stone Horses" (1994)
 "Slide" (1995)
 "Stop" (1999)
 "Drive" (1999)
 "Bowl of Cherries" – includes "Trax in the Rain", "More or Less", "Sweet Love", and "Denim Blue" (2005)
 "Calling All Friends" (2007)
 "Child" (2007)
 "Low Stars epk" (2007)
 "Just Around the Corner" (2007)
 "Interview with Chris Hillman" (2008)
 "More or Less" (2008)
 "Low Stars and Friends" (2009)

References

Rock music discographies
Discographies of American artists
Production discographies
Pop music discographies
Albums produced by Chris Seefried